North Bank College, established in 1961, is a general degree college situated at Ghilamara, in Lakhimpur district, Assam. This college is affiliated with the Dibrugarh University.

Departments

Science
Physics
Mathematics
Chemistry
Computer Science
Anthropology
Geology
Botany
Zoology

Arts 
Assamese
English
History
Education
Economics
Political Science
Geography
Sociology

References

External links
https://www.northbankcollege.in/#

Universities and colleges in Assam
Colleges affiliated to Dibrugarh University
Educational institutions established in 1961
1961 establishments in Assam